Mozilla Europe was a non-profit organisation that promoted and deployed Mozilla products, like Firefox and Thunderbird, in Europe. It was founded on 17 February 2004 by contributors to Mozilla and other free software projects, and was an independent affiliate of the Mozilla Foundation with headquarters in Paris, France. It was disbanded on 17 February 2012 as Mozilla created on late 2011 an official structure in Paris.

The organisation was managed by a board of directors, which includes Tristan Nitot (President), Jean-Christophe Lapprand (Treasurer), Pascal Chevrel (Secretary General), Zbigniew Braniecki, Axel Hecht and Peter Van der Beken.

Languages 

, Mozilla Europe's web site was available in 27 languages: Albanian, Basque, Bulgarian, Catalan, Croatian, Czech, Danish, Dutch, English, Finnish, French, German, Greek, Hungarian, Italian, Lithuanian, Norwegian, Polish, Portuguese, Romanian, Russian, Serbian, Slovak, Spanish, Swedish, Turkish, and Ukrainian. Selected pages are also available in Irish Gaelic, Scottish Gaelic and Welsh.

References

Notes 

Mozilla
Non-profit organizations based in France
Organizations based in Paris
Organizations established in 2004